Morse Park, occupying , is an urban park located in Wong Tai Sin in Kowloon.
It was completed in 1967. The park was named after Sir Arthur Morse (25April 189213May 1967), the head of The Hong Kong and Shanghai Banking Corporation during and after World War II.

City streets divide the park into four sections formally called Morse Park No. 1, Morse Park No. 2, and so on.

History
The Hong Kong Golden Jubilee Jamborette, was held between 27 December 1961 and 2 January 1962, celebrating the Golden jubilee (50 year anniversary) of Hong Kong Scouting with theme One World. At Kowloon Tsai, now named Morse Park, the Jamboree hosted 2,732 Scouts in the challenging winter with heavy rain.

The park site was a former rifle range. The park was known as Takwuling Park before it opened. The first phase of Morse Park was opened on 6 October 1967 by G.M. Tingle, the Director of Urban Services.

The Morse Park Swimming Pool opened in 1970. It was the largest swimming complex in the territory when it first opened, although the similarly-sized pools in Kwun Tong and Lei Cheng Uk opened soon after. Governor Murray MacLehose brought Queen Elizabeth II here in May 1975, using the complex as an exemplar of his government's "commitment to recreation and sport".

In 1996, the landscaping of the park was awarded the Award of Merit of the Green Project.

Blake Pier Pavilion

The pavilion of the Blake Pier was later transferred to the open-air oval theatre in Morse Park. In 2006, the pavilion was once again transferred to the new Stanley Pier next to Murray House.

Facilities

Tropical Palm Garden
More than 80 trees of 23 palm species are grown on the  lawn of the Park's tropical palm garden, the only one in the city.

Arboretum
More than 100 trees of 30 rare species are grown on a  lawn in the Arboretum of the Park.

Gallery

See also

List of urban public parks and gardens in Hong Kong

References

Urban public parks and gardens in Hong Kong
Wong Tai Sin
Lok Fu
Chuk Yuen
Nga Chin Wai